Mate Granić (born 19 September 1947) is a Croatian diplomat and politician who served as Minister of Foreign Affairs in the Government of Croatia from 1993 to 2000.

Biography 
Granić was born in Baška Voda in Dalmatia (then PR Croatia, FPR Yugoslavia). He graduated from a gymnasium in Split and the medical faculty of the University of Zagreb to become a doctor by profession. He specialized in internal medicine.

Mate Granić served as the foreign minister of Croatia from 1993 until 2000. He was a member of the Croatian Democratic Union (HDZ) and a close associate of Franjo Tuđman. As foreign minister, in 1995 Granić helped negotiate the Dayton Agreement, a peace treaty between Croatia, Bosnia and Serbia and he visited Serbia in 1996.

Granić was considered to be a leader of the HDZ center-reformist wing. His objective as foreign minister was to defend Croatian policies concerning its occupied territories and towards Bosnia and Herzegovina, as well as protecting Croatia from UN sanctions.

His reformist views made him an opportunistic choice for the party's presidential candidate after the Tuđman's death. In January 2000, Granić entered the presidential election, but was eliminated in the first round, coming in third place with 22.5% of the vote.

When a new cabinet took office later that month, now with the HDZ without the presidency or control of the Parliament, Granić lost his post as foreign minister. Afterwards, Granić led a splinter faction of HDZ to form the Democratic Centre (Demokratski Centar) as he believed that the HDZ would be completely overtaken by tudjmanists led by Ivić Pašalić, Tuđman's former advisor.

However, not all reformists followed Granić, and in 2002 they finally won a bitter inner-party struggle with the tudjmanists. Granić's former protégé Ivo Sanader became the party's leader, and all that made the Democratic Centre politically indistinct from HDZ. As a result, the party barely survived the 2003 elections, securing only one parliamentary seat, for Vesna Škare-Ožbolt who later became the Minister of Justice in Sanader's government.

Granić left DC and seemingly retired from public life after the election. In 2004 he founded a consulting company called MAGRA Ltd. in Zagreb. In 2005, he became a special advisor to the presidency of the Croatian Party of Rights (HSP).

In the 2007 parliamentary election he headed the HSP election list in the 3rd election unit. The list failed to attain a seat in the Parliament.

In March 2020, Granić returned to the Croatian Democratic Union.

Granić is married with three children. His brother Goran Granić is a prominent Croatian politician, but unlike Mate, Goran is a liberal.

References

1947 births
Living people
People from Baška Voda
Croatian Democratic Union politicians
Democratic Centre (Croatia) politicians
Physicians from Split, Croatia
Croatian diplomats
School of Medicine, University of Zagreb alumni
Academic staff of the University of Zagreb
Foreign ministers of Croatia
Candidates for President of Croatia